The 1981 Oregon Ducks football team represented the University of Oregon in the 1981 NCAA Division I-A football season. Playing as a member of the Pacific-10 Conference (Pac-10), the team was led by head coach Rich Brooks, in his fifth year, and played their home games at Autzen Stadium in Eugene, Oregon. They finished the season with a record of two wins and nine losses  overall,  in

Schedule

Roster
Gary Beck (offense), RS Sr
TB Harry Billups
Jon Brosterhous (offense), RS Sr
TB Reggie Brown
P Ken Burns
Michael Cray #75 (defense)
Donald Davis, RS Sr
Mike Delegato, RS Sr
S Joe Figures (defense)
CB Ross Gibbs
ILB #47 Ed Hagerty, Sr
TE Greg Hogensen, RS Sr
Mike Johnson, Fr.
LS Steve Johnson
PK Doug Jollymour
QB Kevin Lusk
Bob McCray (asst coach)
Greg Moser, Jr
Rick Price (offense), RS Sr
TE Tim Tyler
LB Andy Vobora, Sr
DE Mike Walter
FB Vince Williams, RS Sr
Stu Yatsko (offense), RS Sr

Season summary

Oregon State

NFL Draft
Three Ducks were selected in the 1982 NFL Draft, which lasted twelve rounds (334 selections).

List of Oregon Ducks in the NFL draft

References

Oregon
Oregon Ducks football seasons
Oregon Ducks football